Henry Rogers (born in June 1991) is an English drummer, session artist, producer and sound developer. He is best known for playing with the British progressive rock bands Touchstone, DeeExpus and Edison's Children, and more latterly Mostly Autumn. While his style is very versatile, his musical influences come from his passion for jazz, funk and progressive rock.

Biography
Henry Rogers first got into drumming as a teenage and was tutored by a Big Band drummer who played alongside artists like Sir Paul McCartney and The Who; this is how Rogers came to adopt his style reminiscent of jazz, funk and progressive rock.

Growing up, Henry played in various local bands, including The White Orchids and The Shindiggers, around his home town of Stoke–on–Trent. He was approached by and joined Final Conflict in 2007, touring in both the UK and at festivals in Europe. During his time with the band he was awarded second place in the Best Drummer category in the annual Classic Rock Society awards.

Over the years, Rogers' abilities and talents have grown enormously and have secured him full time positions with Touchstone, DeeExpus and Marillion side project Edison's Children; he continues to impress with his drumming skills, playing for both Puppet Rebellion, who he joined in October 2015, and Mia Klose as well. He is now in such demand that, along with all his full–time band activities, he also plays with The Daughters of Expediency (Alan Reed's live band) and has also played with the Heather Findlay Band. He has also played at several festivals, both large and small, with some of these bands – High Voltage (2010), RoSFest (2010 and 2012), Download, Kendal Calling and Summer's End 2014 and 2016) to name but a few... and he has played as tour support for artists such as Marillion and Steel Panther across the UK and Europe.

His playing skills have not gone unnoticed in the music industry: coming second in the Classic Rock Society (CRS) Drummer of the Year at the age of 17 (as mentioned above), going one better and winning CRS Drummer of the Year two year's running (2012 and 2013), being voted 9th Best Drummer (2012), 7th Best Drummer (2013) and 10th Best Drummer (2016) by Prog magazine readers alongside well–known established drummers including Ian Mosley, Neil Peart and Gavin Harrison; He was also listed in the July 2015 issue of Rhythm magazine as one of the 20 most influential prog drummers of the millennium.

Alongside his work with other musicians such as Alan Reed (Pallas) and with Alan's live band The Daughters of Expediency,  Morpheus Rising and Edison's Children (a project set up by Pete Trewavas and Eric Blackwood featuring Rick Armstrong, the son of the 1st Man on the Moon Neil Armstrong). He is also a well–known session musician (for both live and studio work), regularly working with established musicians both in the UK and from around the globe. He was also recently invited to play with Guy Manning's Damanek, at Summer's End 2016.

Rogers spends a great deal of his time writing and recording for various artists and projects from around the globe in his purpose-built recording studio in Cheshire, including working with Roland on their advertising campaign for their TM-1 Trigger Module.

Current kit and set–up

Full Kit: DW White Marine Pearl
 Rack toms: 8” 10” 12” (8x7 10x8 12x9) 
 Floor toms: 14" 16” (14x12 16x14) 
 Kick drum: 22" (22x18)
 Snare: collector’s series (14x51/2)
 Sabian Cymbals
 Crashes: 16” 17” 18” AAX V-Crash
 Ride: 20” AAX Studio ride
 China: 20” HHX Zen China, 12” AAX mini china, 16” AAX china
 Splashes: 6” AAX splashes x2, 10” o-zone x1
 Hi-Hat: 13” HHX Evolution Hats

Small Kit: DW Black Velvet
 Rack Toms: 10” (10x8)
 Floor toms: 14" 16” (14x12 16x14)
 Kick drum: 22" (22x18)
 Snare: collector’s series (14x51/2)
 Sabian Cymbals
 Crashes: 16” 18” AAX V-Crash
 Ride: 20” AAX Studio ride
 China: 20” HHX Zen China
 Hi-Hat: 13” HHX Evolution Hats

Skins
 White Marine Pearl - REMO Coated Ambassadors on toms, REMO Coated Ambassador X on snare, REMO Powerstroke Pro on kick
 Black Velvet - REMO Pinstripe on toms, REMO Ambassador X on snare, REMO Powerstroke Pro on kick

Sticks
 Los Cabos 5A Intense Signature Henry Rogers

Drum Stool
 Porter & Davies BC2

Cases
 Protection Racket Drum cases

Electronic Recording
 Roland and XLN Audio Addictive Drums 2

Hardware
 DW9000 (pedals, hi-hat and cymbal stands)

Band history

Discography

References

External links 
 Henry Rogers
 Touchstone
 DeeExpus
 Puppet Rebellion
 Mia Klose
 Mostly Autumn

1991 births
Living people
English rock drummers
21st-century drummers